"Lonely" is a song by American rappers DaBaby and Lil Wayne. It was released through South Coast Music Group and Interscope Records originally intended as the third single from DaBaby's fourth studio album. The two artists wrote the song alongside DJ K.i.D, Benjamin Lasnier, and Pilfinger.

Credits and personnel
Credits adapted from Tidal.

 DaBaby – vocals, songwriting
 Lil Wayne – vocals, songwriting
 DJ K.i.D – production, songwriting, recording, studio personnel
 Benjamin Lasnier – production, songwriting
 Pilfinger – production, songwriting
 Derek "MixedByAli" Ali – mixing, studio personnel
 Cyrus "Nois" Taghipour – mixing, studio personnel
 Curtis "Sircut" Bye – assistant mixing, studio personnel
 Nicolas De Porcel – mastering, studio personnel

Charts

References

2021 singles
2021 songs
Interscope Records singles
DaBaby songs
Lil Wayne songs
Songs written by DaBaby
Songs written by Lil Wayne